Chiemsee is a municipality in the district of Rosenheim in Bavaria in Germany, named after the lake Chiemsee. It is Bavaria's smallest municipality by area and the second smallest (after Balderschwang) by population.

The municipal area comprises not the lake itself but the islands of Herrenchiemsee (Herreninsel) with its Palaces, Frauenchiemsee and the uninhabited Krautinsel.

References 

Rosenheim (district)